Praudha Raya (also known as Praudha Deva Raya IV) was a king of Vijayanagara Empire who ruled for a very short period of time but was overpowered and the control of the empire was taken over by his able commander Saluva Narasimha Deva Raya in 1485. He wrote the Ratiratna Pradipika, a book on erotics.

References
 Dr. Suryanath U. Kamat, Concise History of Karnataka, 2001, MCC, Bangalore (Reprinted 2002)
 Durga Prasad, History Andhras up to 1565 A. D., 1988, P.G. Publishers, Don Bosco School Press, Guntur

External links
APonline Article
Ourkarnataka Article
Sangama Article
History of Sexual Medicine

15th-century deaths
People of the Vijayanagara Empire
Sangama dynasty
Year of birth unknown
15th-century Indian monarchs
Scholars of Vijayanagara Empire